Amstenrade is a village in the municipality of Beekdaelen, in the Netherlands. It is located about 7 km northwest of Heerlen. The Amstenrade Castle is located in the village.

History 
The village was first mentioned in 1274 as Anstenroden, and means "cultivation of the forest of Ansto (person)". Amstenrade developed in the Middle Ages on a plateau. The area was cultivated in the 13th century from the Geleenbeek onwards. It was originally a heerlijkheid. In 1654, it was elevated to county. The village concentrated around Amstenrade Castle and the road from Sittard to Heerlen.

The Catholic Our Lady of Immaculate Conception Church is a three aisled church with two tower which was built between 1852 and 1856. In 1932, it was enlarged according to a design by Pierre Cuypers and his son Joseph Cuypers.

Amstenrade was home to 502 people in 1840. Between 1839 and 1982, Amstenrade was a separate municipality. It became part of the municipality of Beekdaelen in 2019.

Amstenrade Castle 
The original  dated from the late-13th century. The tower is the oldest extant part and dates from 1609. In 1780, most of the castle was demolished, and a new castle was built in neoclassic style, however the right wing and north-eastern tower remained unchanged. The castle is still in use as a residential house.

Gallery

References 

Former municipalities of Limburg (Netherlands)
Populated places in Limburg (Netherlands)
Beekdaelen